Konstanz (also written as Constance in English) is a university city with approximately 83,000 inhabitants located at the western end of Lake Constance in the south of Germany. The city houses the University of Konstanz and was the residence of the Roman Catholic Diocese of Konstanz for more than 1,200 years.

Location

The city is located in the state of Baden-Württemberg and situated at the banks of Lake Constance (Bodensee in German). The river Rhine, which starts in the Swiss Alps, passes through Lake Constance and leaves it, considerably larger, by flowing under a bridge connecting the two parts of the city. North of the river lies the larger part of the city with residential areas, industrial estates, and the University of Konstanz; while south of the river is the old town, which houses the administrative centre and shopping facilities in addition to the Hochschule or the University of Applied Sciences. Car ferries provide access across Lake Constance to Meersburg, and the Katamaran provides a shuttle service for pedestrians to Friedrichshafen. The Germany–Switzerland border runs along the southwestern and southern edge of the city, demarcating it from the Swiss town of Kreuzlingen.

Subdivisions

Konstanz is subdivided into 15 wards or districts (Stadtteile). The island of Mainau belonged to the ward of Litzelstetten, a separate municipality, until its incorporation into Konstanz on 1 December 1971.

History

The first traces of civilization in Konstanz date back to the late Stone Age. 
During the reign of Augustus, the Celts living south of the Danube were conquered by the Romans. Around 40 AD, the first Romans settled on the site. This small town on the left bank of the Rhine was probably first called Drusomagus and belonged to the Roman province of Raetia. Its later name, originally Constantia, comes either from the Roman emperor Constantius Chlorus, who fought the Alemanni in the region and built a strong fortress around 300 AD, or from his grandson Constantius II, who visited the region in 354. The remains of the late Roman fortress Constantia were discovered in 2003.

Around 585 the first bishop took up residence in Konstanz and this marked the beginning of the city's importance as a spiritual center. By the late Middle Ages, about one quarter of Konstanz's 6,000 inhabitants were exempt from taxation on account of clerical rights.

Trade thrived during the Middle Ages. Konstanz owned the only bridge in the region, which crossed the Rhine, making it a strategic location in the Duchy of Swabia. Its linen production had made an international name for the city and it was prosperous. In 1192, Konstanz gained the status of Imperial City so it was henceforth subject only to the Holy Roman Emperor.

In 1414 to 1418, the Council of Constance took place, during which, on 6 July 1415, Jan Hus (Czech religious thinker, philosopher and reformer), who was seen as a threat to Christianity by the Roman Catholic Church, was burned at the stake. It was here that the Papal Schism was ended and Pope Martin V was elected during the only conclave ever held north of the Alps. Ulrich von Richental's illustrated chronicle of the Council of Constance testifies to all the major happenings during the Council as well as showing the everyday life of medieval Konstanz. The Konzilgebäude where the conclave was held can still be seen standing by the harbour. Close by stands the Imperia, a statue that was erected in 1993 to satirically commemorate the Council.

In 1460, the Swiss Confederacy conquered Thurgau, Konstanz's natural hinterland. Konstanz then made an attempt to get admitted to the Swiss Confederacy, but the forest cantons voted against its entry, fearing over-bearing city states; Konstanz then joined the Swabian League instead. In the Swabian War of 1499, Konstanz lost its last privileges over Thurgau to the Confederation.

The Protestant Reformation took hold in Konstanz in the 1520s, headed by Ambrosius Blarer. Soon the city declared itself officially Protestant, pictures were removed from the churches, and the bishop temporarily moved to Meersburg, a small town across the lake. The city first followed the Tetrapolitan Confession, and then the Augsburg Confession. However, in 1548 Emperor Charles V imposed the Imperial Ban on Konstanz and it had to surrender to Habsburg Austria which had suddenly attacked. Thus Konstanz lost its status as an imperial city.
The new Habsburg rulers were eager to re-Catholicise the town and in 1604 a Jesuit College was opened. Its accompanying theatre, built in 1610, is the oldest theatre in Germany still performing regularly.

The city became part of the Grand Duchy of Baden in 1806. In 1821, the Bishopric of Constance was dissolved and became part of the Archdiocese of Freiburg. Konstanz became part of the German Empire in 1871 during the unification of Germany. After World War I it was included within the Republic of Baden.

On 22 October 1940, 110 of the last Jewish residents were deported to Gurs internment camp in France. Most of those who were still alive in August 1942 were murdered in either Sobibór or Auschwitz.

Because it almost lies within Switzerland, directly adjacent to the Swiss border, Konstanz was not bombed by the Allied Forces during World War II. The city left all its lights on at night, and thus fooled the bombers into thinking it was actually part of Switzerland.  After the war, Konstanz was included first in South Baden and then in the new state of Baden-Württemberg.

The Altstadt (Old Town), which is large considering the small size of modern Konstanz, has many old buildings and twisting alleys. The city skyline is dominated by Konstanz Cathedral, several other churches and three towers left over from the city wall, one of which marks the place of the former medieval bridge over the Rhine.

The University of Konstanz was established close to the town in 1966. It houses an excellent library with approximately two million books, all freely accessible 24 hours a day, as well as a botanical garden (the Botanischer Garten der Universität Konstanz). Especially since 2007, the university, being one of the nine German universities most successful in the German Universities Excellence Initiative, has gained considerable reputation as a so-called "elite university".

Konstanz was the birthplace of Count Ferdinand von Zeppelin, constructor of the famous Zeppelin airships.
In the late 2010s, Konstanz has become a popular destination for Einkaufstourismus, or cross-border shopping by Swiss due to lower prices on basic items in Germany, a favorable exchange rate between the Swiss franc and the euro, and a generous German VAT refund for non-European Union residents. Retail chains such as H&M and dm have built large new stores near the town's central square to cater to this trade, and some Konstanz residents feel the city is losing its historic character in the process; many of them avoid the area on Saturdays. This has led to friction with officials from Kreuzlingen as their city has seen no economic benefit from this trade, and they have been requesting that their national government bring up the issue of the VAT refund with Germany. Subsequently Germany has introduced a minimum spend amount of €50,01 per receipt for the German VAT to be refunded. Customs clearance centres are conveniently located near shopping centres.

Climate
Its location in south-west Germany gives Konstanz a degraded oceanic climate (Köppen: Cfb) with warm and humid summers (moderated by the lake) as well as cold and snowy winters.

Main sights 
 Archaeological Museum
 Imperia, a 9 m-tall sculpture
 Jan Hus Museum
 Konstanz Cathedral
 Konzil edifice, dating to the 15th century
 Niederburg (Lower Castle)
 Petershausen Abbey
 Remains of a Roman fortress, near the Cathedral
 Schnetztor, fortified gate of the former city walls
Konstanz was also home to a large synagogue, destroyed by the Nazi government in 1938.

Twin towns – sister cities

Konstanz is twinned with:
 Fontainebleau, France (1960)
 Richmond upon Thames, England, United Kingdom (1983)
 Tábor, Czech Republic (1984)
 Lodi, Italy (1986)
 Suzhou, China (2007)

Transport
Konstanz station is served by the High Rhine Railway running west to Singen with connections to all parts of Germany, and the Etzwilen–Konstanz line running south into Switzerland, connecting to major routes at Weinfelden. Services are provided by the Deutsche Bahn AG and also the Swiss Thurbo company and its German subsidiary. The nearest airport is at Friedrichshafen, which can be reached by a fast ferry service on the lake, which also connects Konstanz to other lakeside towns. The airport mainly hosts domestic flights, but flights to Austria and Turkey are available. The nearest international airports are in Stuttgart, in Basel, and Zurich, which has a direct train from Konstanz. Bus services within the city are provided by Stadtwerke Konstanz GmbH.

Additionally Konstanz and Friedrichshafen have been connected by the two (since 2008, three) catamarans Constance and Fridolin since 2005.

World Heritage Site

It is home to one or more prehistoric pile-dwelling (or stilt house) settlements that are part of the Prehistoric Pile dwellings around the Alps UNESCO World Heritage Site.

Notable people

Public service and commerce 

Ulrich Zasius (1461–1536), jurist 
Ernst Vögelin (1529–1589), pioneer book printer
Wacker von Wackenfels (1550–1619), diplomat, scholar and author
Johann Friedrich Cotta (1764–1832) a publisher, industrial pioneer and politician; in 1825 he started steamboats on Lake Constance.
Johann Leonhard Hug (1765–1846) a Catholic theologian, orientalist and biblical scholar.
Guillaume Henri Dufour (1787–1875) a Swiss military officer, structural engineer and topographer.
Josef Albert Amann (junior) (1866–1919), gynecologist
Conrad Grober (1872–1948), priest and archbishop, teacher and pastor in Konstanz
Friedrich Flick (1883–1972), entrepreneur and convicted Nazi war criminal
 (1885–1957), countess and Benedictine nun, religious superior at the Municipal Women's Clinic Konstanz
Siegfried Adolf Handloser (1885–1954), doctor of the German Armed Forces Medical Services
 (1887–1944), victim of Nazism
Werner Berger (1901–1964), SS-Oberscharführer and member of commando 99 in Buchenwald concentration camp
 (1911–1984), jurist
Egon Mayer (1917–1944), fighter ace in the Luftwaffe during World War II
Werner Maihofer (1918–2009), politician (FDP), member of Bundestag, minister of the interior (1974–1978)
Theo Sommer (1930–2022), newspaper editor at Die Zeit since 1958, rising to editor-in-chief and publisher
Rolf Böhme (1934–2019), Staatssekretär (1978–1982), mayor of Freiburg (1982–2002)
 (b. 1949), jurist, Lord Mayor of Konstanz 1996–2012
Ian Murdock (1973–2015), American software engineer, founder of the Debian project 
Larissa Vassilian (born 1976), German-Armenian journalist

The arts 
Tobias Pock (1609–1683), Austrian Baroque painter of Swabian descent, a pioneer of sacral art
Marie Ellenrieder (1791–1863), painter
 (1883–1967), writer
Anne Winterer (1894–1938), photographer
François Stahly (1911–2006), French sculptor
 (1920–1984), art historian and founder of Bauhaus-Archive
 (born 1925), dialect author
Berthold Keller (1927–2012), trade unionist
Martin Gotthard Schneider (1930–2017), church musician, songwriter and theologian
Uli Trepte (1941–2009), musician
Carola Zwick (born 1966), product designer

Gallery

See also
 Alexander-von-Humboldt-Gymnasium
 Cathedral of Konstanz
 Hochschule Konstanz (University of Applied Sciences)
 University of Konstanz
 Tägermoos

Notes

References

External links

 
 Official website
  Konstanz: history and images
 University of Konstanz
 Pictures Konstanz
 Online journal about Constance
 University of Applied Sciences
 Photos of the Carnival (~Shrovetide, ~Mardi Grass) in Constance
 Südkurier (Südkurier) Local newspaper for Konstanz

Towns in Baden-Württemberg
Populated places on Lake Constance
Populated places on the Rhine
Konstanz (district)
Free imperial cities
Germany–Switzerland border crossings
Former states and territories of Baden-Württemberg
Baden